Glenelg South is a suburb on the coast of Adelaide, South Australia.

References

Suburbs of Adelaide